Francis Kelly (July 5, 1859 – May 19, 1938) was a United States Navy sailor and a recipient of America's highest military decoration—the Medal of Honor—for his actions in the Spanish–American War.

Biography
Francis Kelly was born Archibald Houston in Anderston, Glasgow, Scotland. He enlisted in the US Navy from  Massachusetts, and served as a watertender in the collier  during the Spanish–American War. Kelly was one of eight volunteer crew members when Rear Admiral William T. Sampson ordered Merrimac sunk to block the entrance of Santiago Harbor, Cuba. On the night of 2-June 3, 1898, during the attempt to execute this mission, Merrimacs steering gear was disabled by enemy gunfire, and she sank without obstructing navigation. Her crewmen were rescued by the Spanish and made prisoners-of-war. After the Battle of Santiago de Cuba destroyed the Spanish fleet a month later, Kelly and his shipmates were released. For his actions during this operation, he was awarded the Medal of Honor.

Francis Kelly remained in the Navy after the Spanish–American War, ultimately obtaining the rank of chief machinist's mate. He returned home to Glasgow, and died there in 1938, his death certificate states "Archibald Houston (formerly Francis Kelly), US naval pensioner". He is buried at Sandymount Cemetery, Glasgow, Scotland.

Medal of Honor citation
Kelly's official Medal of Honor citation reads as follows:
In connection with the sinking of the U.S.S. Merrimac at the entrance to the harbor of Santiago de Cuba, June 2, 1898. Despite heavy fire from the Spanish batteries, KELLY displayed extraordinary heroism throughout this operation.

See also

 List of Medal of Honor recipients for the Spanish–American War

References

“Statutory Births 1855–2018,” database and images, ScotlandsPeople (http://www.scotlandspeople.gov.uk : accessed 16 March 2011), image, birth registration, Archibald Houston, born 6 March 1859, registered 25 March 1859, District of Anderston, County of Lanark; citing Statutory Registers no. 644/8  975.

“Statutory Deaths 1855–2018,” database and images, ScotlandsPeople (http://www.scotlandspeople.gov.uk : accessed 22 July 2011), image, death registration, Archibald Houston, died 19 May 1838, District of College, County of Lanark; citing Statutory Registers     no. 644/7  128.

 

1859 births
1938 deaths
United States Navy Medal of Honor recipients
United States Navy sailors
American military personnel of the Spanish–American War
Spanish–American War prisoners of war held by Spain
Military personnel from Glasgow
Spanish–American War recipients of the Medal of Honor